The 1898 Atlantic hurricane season ran through the summer and the first half of fall in 1898. The season was fairly active, with 11 storms forming, five of which became hurricanes.



Timeline

Systems

Hurricane One 

A "feeble" tropical disturbance developed into a tropical storm near West End, Grand Bahama, early on August 2. Three hours later, the storm made landfall in Hobe Sound, Florida, with winds of 40 mph (65 km/h). The system briefly weakened to a tropical depression on August 2, before re-strengthening into a tropical storm and emerging into the Gulf of Mexico near Tarpon Springs. Later that day, the cyclone intensified quickly, becoming a Category 1 hurricane on the modern-day Saffir–Simpson hurricane wind scale at 23:00 UTC. Simultaneously, the hurricane made landfall on St. George Island with winds of 80 mph (130 km/h). After moving inland, it rapidly weakened and dissipated over southwestern Alabama late on August 3.

About 24 hours of heavy rainfall was observed in the Tampa area, with "great damage done in many places." In the Florida Panhandle, considerable impact was inflicted to crops, turpentine farms, and property. Offshore, three barges, four tugboats, and many sailing crafts were sunk. Among the capsized vessels was the tugboat Nimrod, with 12 people aboard, all of whom drowned.

Hurricane Two 

The next storm formed off the northern coast of Florida on August 30 causing significant damage to coastland communities when it made landfall. It hit around the border usually between South Carolina and Georgia with  winds, and dissipated on September 1, causing $400,000 in damage (1898 dollars).

Hurricane Three

Hurricane Four 

The Windward Islands Hurricane of 1898

Tropical Storm Five 

The fifth storm formed over the western Caribbean Sea on September 12. It tracked northwestward, and hit the Yucatán Peninsula with 60 mph (97 km/h) winds. Later, the storm traveled north. It hit Louisiana on September 20 with 60 mph (97 km/h) winds and dissipated over Illinois on September 22.

Tropical Storm Six 

The sixth storm formed over the western Caribbean Sea on September 20. It followed a path similar to the fifth storm, tracking northwestward and hitting the Yucatán Peninsula with 60 mph (97 km/h) winds. Later, it traveled north. The system hit the United States near the Texas/Louisiana border on September 28, and dissipated shortly thereafter.

Hurricane Seven 

The Georgia Hurricane of 1898

The seventh storm formed to the east of the Lesser Antilles on September 25 and traveled northwest, reaching 110 mph (177 km/h) winds but sparing the islands. On the 2nd, it made landfall as a category 4 hurricane in Cumberland Island, Georgia and northeast Florida with 130 mph (217 km/h) winds, causing heavy damage amounting to around $2.5 million, and 179 casualties. It dissipated after winding its way through Alabama, Tennessee, Kentucky, Indiana, Michigan, southern Canada, part of Maine, and Newfoundland on October 6.

Tropical Storm Eight 

The eighth storm formed in the Western Caribbean, crossing to the northeast across Cuba, and dissipated over the Bahamas. It formed on September 25 and dissipated on September 28.

Tropical Storm Nine 

A tropical wave forms into a tropical depression on October 2 with winds of 45 MPH. The storm moved across Cuba causing minor flooding and crop damage killing 2, then nearly struck Florida. It then moved to the North Eastern sea and dissipated October 14.

This caused flooding and extensive damage on Sapelo Island, Georgia, including destroying a church at the community of Hanging Bull and washing away an entire cemetery.

Tropical Storm Ten 

The 10th storm of the season followed a path similar to the 8th storm, forming in the West Caribbean, crossing Cuba, and dissipating over the Bahamas. This storm lasted from October 21 to October 23

Tropical Storm Eleven 

The final storm of the season formed over the Northern Lesser Antilles on October 27 and took a nearly straight-lined path to the west, hitting the Yucatán Peninsula with 60 mph (95 km/h) winds, and dissipated soon after on November 4.

See also 

 List of tropical cyclones
 Atlantic hurricane season

References

External links 
 Monthly Weather Review

 
1898 meteorology
1898 natural disasters